The 2019 South Staffordshire District Council election took place on 2 May 2019 to elect members of the South Staffordshire District Council in England. It was held on the same day as other local elections.

Summary

Election result

|-

Ward results

Bilbrook

Brewood and Coven

Cheslyn Hay North and Saredon

Cheslyn Hay South

Codsall North

Codsall South

Essington

Featherstone and Shareshill

Great Wyrley Landywood

Great Wyrley Town

Himley and Swindon

Huntington and Hatherton

Kinver

Pattingham and Patshull

Penkridge South East

Penkridge West

Perton East

Perton Lakeside

Wheaton Aston, Bishopswood and Lapley

Wombourne North and Lower Penn

Wombourne South East

References

2019 English local elections
May 2019 events in the United Kingdom
2019
2010s in Staffordshire